Kilmaglish is a townland in County Westmeath, Ireland.

Kilmaglish is one of 11 townlands of the civil parish of Tyfarnham in the barony of Corkaree in the Province of Leinster.

The neighbouring townlands are: Galmoylestown Upper to the north, Parsonstown to the north–east, Garraree to the east, Knockdrin to the south–east, Ballynagall to the south, Knockdrin Demesne to the south and Garrysallagh to the north–east.

In the 1911 census of Ireland there were 4 houses and 17 inhabitants in the townland.

References

External links
Map of Kilmaglish at openstreetmap.org
Kilmaglish at the IreAtlas Townland Data Base
Kilmaglish at Townlands.ie
Kilmaglish at The Placenames Database of Ireland

Townlands of County Westmeath